The Christian Social Party (CSP) is a political party in Switzerland of the Christian left. The CSP is more aligned with social democracy than the other major Christian party, the Christian Democratic People's Party of Switzerland (CVP), which is more economically liberal. With the moderate Christian left as its background, the CSP commits itself to social-democratic and environmentalist political solutions. The core principles of the CSP contain, among others, "solidarity with the socially and economically disadvantaged and the preservation of the environment."

Electoral power
As of 2016, the CSP does not hold any seats in the National Council of Switzerland.

A seat in the lower house was once held for decades by Hugo Fasel representing the canton of Fribourg.

On a cantonal level, the CSP has many elected members, mainly in the Roman Catholic cantons of Valais, Fribourg, Obwalden and Jura. In the latter, the CSP had until late 2010 one elected member in the Executive body, the Conseil d'Etat of the Republic of Jura (where it operates as the Independent Christian Social Party).

Positions 
A member of the Christian left, the CSP is a centre-left political party overall and has strong environmentalist views. It also has social values and aims to tax richer people. On a societal point of view, it has more progressive views and acts in favour of abortion rights, same-sex relationships and euthanasia, which differs strongly with other common Christian political parties, which are traditionally socially conservative.

See also
 Christian left

References

External links
 Christian Social Party at swisspolitics.org

 Home page (in German); (in French)
 Umbrella organization including Freiburg chapter of the party (in German)
 CSP Jura (in French)
 CSP Näfels (in German)

Catholic political parties
Catholic social teaching
Christian socialist organizations
Political parties in Switzerland
Socialist parties in Switzerland